Stoumont is a municipality of Wallonia located in the province of Liège, Belgium. 

On January 1, 2006, Stoumont had a total population of 3,006. The total area is 108.45 km2 which gives a population density of 28 inhabitants per km2.

The municipality consists of the following districts: Chevron, La Gleize, Lorcé, Rahier, and Stoumont.

See also
 List of protected heritage sites in Stoumont

References

External links
 

Municipalities of Liège Province